The Foreign Affairs Committee is one of the eight standing committees of the French National Assembly.

Chairmen 

 Édouard Balladur - 12th legislature of the French Fifth Republic
 Axel Poniatowski - 13th legislature of the French Fifth Republic
 Élisabeth Guigou - 14th legislature of the French Fifth Republic
Marielle de Sarnez - 15th legislature of the French Fifth Republic, Jean-Louis Bourlanges after her death in January 2021

References 

Foreign relations of France
Committees of the National Assembly (France)